Vasili Sergeyevich Rozhnov (born 29 March 1972) is a Russian professional football coach and a former player.

External links
 

1972 births
People from Kolomna
Living people
Soviet footballers
Russian footballers
Association football midfielders
FC Saturn Ramenskoye players
Russian football managers
FC Znamya Truda Orekhovo-Zuyevo managers
FC Dynamo Vologda players
FC Ararat Moscow managers
FC Sheksna Cherepovets players
Sportspeople from Moscow Oblast